Macclesfield Museums is a collection of four museums focusing on Macclesfield and the Silk Industry. The museums are owned by Cheshire East, the local council, and managed on their behalf by the Macclesfield Silk Heritage Trust. The museums are called The Silk Museum, Paradise Mill, West Park Museum and The Old Sunday School.

The Silk Museum

Macclesfield became a centre of the Silk Industry during the Industrial Revolution. The museum hosts a collection of silk artwork, silk weaving machines and silk historical artifacts. The building was  originally known as Macclesfield School of Art and opened in 1877 to train designers for the silk trade.

Paradise Mill

Paradise Mill is a former silk mill built in 1862, later converted into a working museum with 26 Jacquard looms. It is built in brick with Welsh slate roofs, is in four storeys, and has a 13-bay front. The right three bays project forward and contain an Art Deco entrance.

West Park Museum

West Park Museum was built by Marianne Brocklehurst, who came from a wealthy silk trade family, and houses her collection of Ancient Egyptian artifacts, a selection of fine art and local history items. Refurbishment of the museum was proposed in 2018. The building is grade II listed with Historic England. Constructed in 1897–98 it is built in brick with terracotta dressings and has a Welsh slate roof. It is in a single storey and consists of a single room that is lit from above by a clerestory. The entrance front has a shaped gable, and a decorative terracotta frieze and panels. There is a glass verandah on the right side.

The Old Sunday School

Macclesfield Sunday School now called The Old Sunday School was closed in September 1973. It had stopped keeping registers in 1967 when average attendance was fourteen. Though the fabric of the building was deteriorating it was listed as a Grade II* building because of its historical significance. The building now has multiple uses which include a Museum with Victorian school room and a cinema.

See also

List of museums in Cheshire
List of textile mills in Cheshire

References

Sources
Hartwell, Clare; Hyde, Matthew; Hubbard, Edward; Pevsner, Nikolaus (2011) [1971], Cheshire, The Buildings of England, New Haven and London: Yale University Press,

External links
Macclesfield Museums official website

Macclesfield
Tourist attractions in Cheshire
Museums in Cheshire